Niederlauterbach is a commune in the Bas-Rhin department in Grand Est in north-eastern France.

Notable people 
 Roland Ries (born 1945), politician, mayor of Strasbourg between 2008 and 2020

See also
 Communes of the Bas-Rhin department

References

Communes of Bas-Rhin